Senate elections were held in the Czech Republic on 12 November 2000, with a second round on 19 November. The result was a victory for the Civic Democratic Party, which won 22 of the 81 seats. Voter turnout was 33.4% in the first round and 21.5% in the second.

Opinion polls

Results

References

2000 elections in the Czech Republic
2000 in the Czech Republic
2000
November 2000 events in Europe